Abracris is a genus of short-horned grasshoppers in the family Acrididae. There are at least three described species in Abracris, found in North, Central, and South America.

Species
These three species belong to the genus Abracris:
 Abracris bromeliae Roberts & Carbonell, 1981
 Abracris dilecta Walker, 1870
 Abracris flavolineata (De Geer, 1773)

References

Acrididae